Granvill Anthony Haley (May 13, 1901 – December 9, 1976), nicknamed "Red", was an American Negro league infielder in the 1920s and 1930s.

A native of Cass County, Missouri, Haley made his Negro leagues debut in 1928 with the Chicago American Giants and Birmingham Black Barons. He went on to play for the Kansas City Monarchs and Bismarck Churchills. Haley died in Sandusky, Ohio in 1976 at age 75.

References

External links
 and Baseball-Reference Black Baseball stats and Seamheads

1901 births
1976 deaths
Birmingham Black Barons players
Bismarck Churchills players
Chicago American Giants players
Kansas City Monarchs players
20th-century African-American sportspeople